The Armu is a river in Krasnoarmeysky District of Primorsky Krai, a tributary of the Bolshaya Ussurka.

The river is a popular place of tourism and fishing. One brand of vodka has been named after it.

Notes

Rivers of Primorsky Krai